Rhynchopyga meisteri is a moth in the subfamily Arctiinae. It is found in Brazil (Amazons, Castro, Parana, Rio de Janeiro) and Argentina.

References

Arctiidae genus list at Butterflies and Moths of the World of the Natural History Museum

Moths described in 1883
Euchromiina